Prratima is an Indian television series that aired on Sahara One channel in 2004. The series premiered on 23 August 2004. The series was produced by Rajaa Mukherji, the brother of Bollywood actress Rani Mukherji, and starred Kirron Kher in an important role. The story is based on the Bengali novel, "Protima", written by Tara Shankar Bandopadhyay. The series ended on 21 June 2005.

Cast
 Jyoti Mukherjee as Prratima Ghosh / Prratima Amol Roy
 Anuj Saxena as Amol Roy (before plastic surgery)
 Vinay Jain as Amol Roy (after plastic surgery) / Venu
 Kirron Kher as Sunanda Sukumar Roy
 Vineeta Malik as Kaushalya Roy (Dadi Maa)
 Alka Kaushal as Asha Dharmesh Thakur
 Pawan Kumar as Atul Roy
 Ekta Sharma as Shivani Roy
 Rajeev Verma as Sukumar Roy
 Manasi Salvi as Prema Ghosh
 Shishir Sharma as Tapendu Ghosh
 Nitesh Pandey as Palash Ghosh
 Abir Goswami as Malen
 Dimple Inamdar as Simran
 Buddhaditya Mohanty as Nilesh
 Shama Deshpande as Sumitra Tapendu Ghosh
 Yatin Karyekar as Dharmesh Thakur
 Nigaar Khan as Anjali Thakur / Anjali Atul Roy
 Ashiesh Roy as Pundarik
 Sonia Singh as Anamika Roy
 Sudha Chandran as Alkalata Roy
 Sulbha Arya
 Jayant Saverkar
 Shashi Puri
 Sadhana Singh

References

External links
Prratima News Article

Sahara One original programming
Indian television soap operas
Indian television series
2004 Indian television series debuts